Fernando Sánchez Dragó (born 2 October 1936) is a Spanish writer and television host.

Biography 
He was born in the Salamanca district of Madrid, the posthumous son of Fernando Sánchez Monreal, a journalist who was killed in the Civil War by the Rebel faction. His father was director of the news agency Febus, as well as director of the agency Noti-Sport.

Sánchez was a student at the Colegio del Pilar and at the University of Madrid (now known as the Complutense). A young member of the Communist Party of Spain PCE in his youth, he was imprisoned because of his opposition to Francoist Spain and was in exile for seven years.

Sánchez Dragó participated along other figures linked to Spanish Nouvelle Droite in the Manifesto Against the Death of the Spirit and the Earth in 2002, later forming the Asociación Manifiesto, a meeting point of old and new reactionaries as well as former CEDADE members.

Labelled as a "new reactionary", he has however described himself as an individualist libertarian anarchist.
The author of more than 45 books, he won the 1979 Premio Nacional de Ensayo for his essay Gárgoris y Habidis. Una historia mágica de España. This work is vividly criticised because of its antisemitic content, mostly attacking Ashkenazi Jews.

He also won the 1992 Premio Planeta for his novel La prueba del laberinto and the 2006 Fernando Lara Novel Award for his book, based on the life and death of his father, Muertes paralelas.

In a 2010 work titled Dios los cría... y ellos hablan de sexo, drogas, España, corrupción..., Sánchez Dragó bragged about having had sex with two thirteen year-old minors during his time in Japan in 1967.

A noted endorsement in the meeting of the political party Vox celebrated in the Palacio Vistalegre in October 2018, he has avowed to support 90% of the party political programme.

Awards 
 Adopted Son of Soria (1992)

References

1936 births
Living people
People from Madrid
Spanish prisoners and detainees
Spanish television presenters
Spanish television journalists
Spanish television personalities
Male essayists
Spanish essayists
Spanish literary critics
20th-century Spanish writers
21st-century Spanish writers
Antisemitism in Spain
Spanish anti-communists
Spanish libertarians
Spanish educators